ORYX GTL (Arabic: أوريكس جي تي إل) is a synthetic fuel plant based in Ras Laffan Industrial City, Qatar, owned by QatarEnergy (51%) and Sasol (49%). It uses gas to liquids (GTL) technology for converting natural gas into liquid petroleum products.

History
Construction of the plant started in 2003. The plant began production in 2007.

References

External links

 Official website

Natural gas plants
Petroleum production
Energy infrastructure in Qatar
Natural gas in Qatar
Synthetic fuel facilities
Energy infrastructure completed in 2007
2007 establishments in Qatar